John Inglis may refer to:

Sportspeople
 John Inglis (footballer, born 1857) (1857–1942), Scottish footballer who played as a goalkeeper
 John Inglis (footballer, born 1859) (1859–?), Scottish footballer who played as a forward
 John Inglis (footballer, born 1966), Scottish footballer who played as a defender
 John Inglis (American football) (1887–1918), American college football coach
 John Inglis (cricketer) (born 1979), English cricketer for Yorkshire
 John Frederic Inglis (1853–1923), Kent county cricketer, also played football for Wanderers and Scotland

Other
 John Inglis, Lord Glencorse (1810–1891), Scottish former politician and Judge
 Sir John Inglis, 2nd Baronet (1683–1771), Postmaster General for Scotland
 John Inglis (bishop) (1777–1850), Church of England bishop
 John Inglis (missionary) (1808–1891), Scottish missionary to the New Hebrides
 John Inglis (shipbuilder) (1842–1919), Scottish engineer and shipbuilder at A. & J. Inglis
 John Inglis (trade unionist) (died 1912), Scottish trade union leader
 John G. Inglis (1899–1990), Canadian electrical engineer and transit manager
 John Eardley Inglis (1814–1862), Scottish soldier
 John K. Inglis (?–2011), British biologist and writer
 John C. Inglis (born 1954), former Deputy Director of the National Security Agency
 John Gilchrist Inglis (1906–1972), British Royal Navy officer
 John Inglis (moderator) (1762–1834), Scottish minister of the Church of Scotland
 John Alexander Inglis (1873–1941), Scottish landowner, advocate and historian
 John Inglis (civil servant) (1820–1854), East India Company civil servant
 John Inglis and Company, Canadian firm, formerly a weapons manufacturer, then a domestic appliance manufacturer
 John Inglis (Royal Navy officer) (1743–1807), Scottish Royal Navy officer

Inglis, John